Henry Bircher "Bert" Laing (1893-1963) was a New Zealand rugby league player who represented New Zealand and Australasia. His brother, Albert, was also a New Zealand international.

Playing career
Laing, a standoff from Auckland, represented New Zealand between 1919 and 1925 and was the team's captain in 1925. However he never played in a Test match for New Zealand, due to the team usually playing New South Wales and Queensland during this period.

In 1921 he was the only New Zealander selected to represent Australasia during the 1921–22 Kangaroo tour of Great Britain. He scored one try and played in ten matches on tour but was not selected for any of the three Test matches.

Laing played for the City Rovers from 1919 to 1922 but transferred to Devonport United during the 1922 season. During the 1920s he played some matches with his younger brother Julius for Devonport. He retired at the end of the 1926 season but came out of retirement to play 2 matches for Devonport in 1927 and then four more matches in 1930. Another of his brothers, Albert Laing debuted for Devonport in late 1931 and also went on to play for New Zealand.

Bert coached the North Shore Albions in 1936 and the Manukau seniors in 1938.

Death
Bert Laing died on April 25, 1963. He was cremated at Purewa Cemetery and his ashes were returned to his family.

References

1893 births
1963 deaths
Auckland rugby league team players
Australasia rugby league team players
Australia national rugby league team players
City Rovers players
New Zealand national rugby league team captains
New Zealand national rugby league team players
New Zealand rugby league players
North Island rugby league team players
North Shore Albions coaches
North Shore Albions players
Rugby league five-eighths